Giant Killers (stylized as GiANT KiLLERS) is the first EP by Japanese idol group Bish released through Avex Trax on June 28, 2017. The EP was released in 4 editions, with the Limited and "INTRODUCiNG BiSH" editions featuring a second disc titled "INTRODUCiNG BiSH", which is essentially a "Best Of" album. All tracks on the disc originally released before Ayuni D joined the group have been re-recorded with her vocals. The EP was released early through iTunes on June 9. Those that pre-ordered the iTunes edition of the EP on June 8 received both the EP and the "INTRODUCiNG BiSH" tracks for the price of 900 yen. The music video for the title track "GiANT KiLLERS" was released on YouTube on June 12, followed by the video for "Nothing." on July 31.

Track listing

Personnel
BiSH – Lyrics on Disc 2 Tracks 1, 8 and 9
Cent Chihiro Chittiii – vocals
Aina the End – vocals
Momoko Gumi Company – vocals; lyrics on Tracks 2, 3 and Disc 2 Track 5
Lingling – vocals; lyrics on Tracks 5 and Disc 2 Track 7
Hashiyasume Atsuko – vocals; lyrics on Track 4
Ayuni D – vocals; lyrics on Disc 2 Track 11
Ex. Bish
Yukako Love Deluxe – lyrics on Disc 2 Track 3

Notes
All writing, arrangement and personnel credits taken from the album insert and from track previews posted on Twitter.

References

2017 albums
BiSH albums